Panchev (also appearing in the transliteration variants Pančev, Pantschew or Pantschow) – with its female form Pancheva – is a Bulgarian and Macedonian surname which is derived from the male given name Pancho (also transliterated as Pančo or Panco), a shortened version of the Bulgarian given name Panayot that stems from the Greek name Panagiotis, meaning "all-holy." 

Notable people with the name Panchev/Pančev include:

Asen Panchev (1906–1989), Bulgarian footballer
Gavrail Panchev (born 1954), Bulgarian author, researcher and publicist
Darko Pančev (born 1965), retired Macedonian footballer

References

Macedonian-language surnames
Bulgarian-language surnames